Stefan Józef Godlewski (5 August 1894 in Warsaw – 6 September 1942 in Auschwitz) was a Polish poet and novelist.

He was imprisoned and died in the German concentration camp Auschwitz.

References 

1894 births
1942 deaths
Polish people who died in Auschwitz concentration camp
Polish civilians killed in World War II
Writers from Warsaw